The National Dance Association (NDA), is a former association of SHAPEAmerica originally titled American Alliance for Health, Physical Education, Recreation and Dance (AAHPERD).  It was the oldest of dance education organizations, and developed programs, published books and materials, and sponsored professional development conferences for dance educators in a broad range of disciplines. It also functioned as an arts advocacy organization.

NDA was first known as the National Section on Dance and was officially recognized in 1932 with Helen Norman Smith as Chair.  It was elevated to Divisional status in 1965 and nine years later became the National Dance Association within the newly renamed American Alliance for Health, Physical Education, Recreation and Dance (AAHPERD). By 1989, its membership had grown to nearly three thousand. In 2013 NDA was dissolved as AAHPERD became one unified organization and changed its name to SHAPE America (Society of Health and Physical Education).

References

Dance education in the United States
Dance organizations
 Educational organizations based in the United States
 Arts organizations established in 1932
1932 establishments in the United States
 Reston, Virginia
 Organizations disestablished in 2013
Defunct organizations based in Virginia